Laurent Pillon (born 31 March 1964 in Creil) is a French former cyclist. He participated in the Tour de France five times and eight Grand Tours overall. His son Romain Pillon also competed professionally.

Major results

1987
 1st Circuit des Ardennes
1990
 2nd Duo Normand (with Francis Moreau)
 3rd Overall Tour du Limousin
 6th Chrono des Herbiers
1992
 7th Overall Grand Prix du Midi Libre
1993
 1st Stage 4 (TTT) Tour de France
1995
 8th Overall Tour du Limousin
1997
 7th Route Adélie
 10th Grand Prix d'Ouverture La Marseillaise
1999
 8th Overall Tour du Poitou-Charentes

Grand Tour general classification results timeline

References

External links

1964 births
Living people
French male cyclists
Sportspeople from Oise
Cyclists from Hauts-de-France
20th-century French people